Munroe & Francis was a publishing firm in Boston, Massachusetts, in the early 19th-century. Established by David Francis (1779–1853) and Edmund Monroe, the business operated from offices on Court Street (c. 1805–1807) and Washington Street (c. 1823–1832). In the 19th century the firm expanded to include Samuel H. Parker as partner, and was called Munroe, Francis & Parker until 1810. In 1802–1804 Munroe & Francis issued the first Boston edition of William Shakespeare's works.

Works issued by the firm
 
 Monthly Anthology, c. 1804–1807.
 
 Mother Goose, 1824
  (1828 ed.)

References

External links

 WorldCat. Munroe & Francis

19th century in Boston
Book publishing companies based in Massachusetts
Economic history of Boston
Cultural history of Boston
Publishing companies established in 1805